The Malay gamelan (Malay/Indonesian: gamelan Melayu; Jawi: ݢاميلن ملايو) is a style of music originated from Indonesia, performed in ethnic Malay-populated regions of Indonesia (particularly in North Sumatra, Riau and Riau Islands) and Malaysia (particularly in Pahang, Terengganu and Johor) as well.

Etymology
While the word of  refer to the Malays which had its correlation to Melayu Kingdom.

History
Joget Gamelan is one of the classical Malay dance that uses gamelan instruments. This classic dance was first performed at the Palace in the Riau-Lingga (present-day Indonesia) in the 17th century. It was first performed in public in Pekan, Pahang in 1811 in the wedding ceremony of Tengku Hussain, the son of Sultan Abdul Rahman who ruled Lingga, with Wan Esah, the younger sister of Bendahara Ali from Pahang. It was first introduced in Terengganu after Tengku Mariam, a princess in Pahang, married Tengku Sulaiman, the prince to Tengku Zainal Abidin from Terengganu. In 1913, the Malay Gamelan tradition disappeared from the abolition of the Riau-Lingga Sultanate and later moved to Pahang, and until it spread to Terengganu. The Malay gamelan was first brought to Kuala Lumpur in 1969 in a public performance. Since then, it has become a part of the Malaysian arts and cultural heritage. In the past, about 80 traditional gamelan music were performed but this has now been reduced to 50, with 12 songs being the common ones, some of them include Timang Burung, Ayak-Ayak and Seri Rama Balik. 

In 2021, Gamelan was listed as a Masterpieces of the Oral and Intangible Heritage of Humanity by UNESCO, part of the intangible cultural heritage of Indonesia.

Instruments
Based on the gamelan set discovered in 1966 at Istana Kolam, Terengganu, a set of Terengganu Malay gamelan consists of seven basic instruments:
 Keromong, also known as bonang (a set of 10 small kettle gongs)
 Gambang (a wooden xylophone)
 Saron perkin  (another set of metallophones, slightly smaller than saron kecil)
 Saron kecil, also known as saron barung (a set of metallophones)
 Saron besar, also known as saron demung (another set of metallophones, slightly bigger than saron kecil)
 Kenong (a set of 5 large kettle gongs)
 A pair of hanging gongs, which are gong kecil and gong besar
 Gendang (a barrel drum)

Joget gamelan 

According to Tengku Mariam, this dance repository originally consisted of 77 types of gamelan. But today there are only 33 types left as a result of the absence of dance instructors. Among the 33 types of dances that remain are such as Timang Burung, Ayak-ayak, Lambang Sari, Ketam Renjung, Geliung, Lantai Lima, Kending Gajah, Togok Rompin, Kunang-kunang Mabuk, Galuk Merajuk, Silatin, Lolo and Monab.

This dance performed exclusively by female dancers can be staged internally or openly.

See also 

 Gamelan
 Gamelan outside Indonesia

References

Gamelan
Gamelan ensembles and genres
Malay culture
Indonesian culture
Malaysian culture
Music of Sumatra
Sacred musical instruments